Dominik Feri (born 11 July 1996) is a Czech ex-politician who served as Member of the Chamber of Deputies, starting in 2017. Elected at the age of 21 years old, he was the youngest member of the Chamber of Deputies, as well as the first representative to be black. In 2019, Feri was named one of Politico 28 list of people who are most likely to shape the European future.  

In 2021 Feri, a vocal supporter of the Me Too movement, stepped down following several accusations of sexual abuse and rape. Following investigation, police brought multiple rape and attempted rape charges against Feri, including for a rape of a child. If convicted, Feri could face up to 10 years in prison. According to charges, one of the rapes was committed within the Parliament building.

Early life
Feri was born in Kadaň, northwestern Bohemia, and grew up in Teplice District. His mother is from eastern Bohemia, and Feri is also partly of Ethiopian origin. From 2007 to 2015 he studied in a grammar school in Teplice. His first appearance in media was because of his public activities in Teplice. In 2015 he became a student of Faculty of Law at the Charles University in Prague.

Political career
During the municipal elections in 2014 he was an independent candidate on the candidate list of liberal-conservative party TOP 09 to the Council of Representatives in Teplice, although he wasn't elected, he became a first deputy candidate for that office, despite of his young age. After the leader of the candidate list Petr Měsíc resigned, Feri took the office and became one of nine members of City Council, which was led by mayor Jaroslav Kubera. In May 2015 he entered TOP 09 Party.

After the unsuccessful candidacy in 2016 Czech regional elections he was listed on the last place of the candidate list in District of Prague in 2017 Czech legislative election. On 21 October, he was elected to the office to the Chamber of Deputies. German magazine Die Welt considered Feri to be a successful and promising pro-European politician.

In April 2019, Feri was attacked at a wine tasting event in Boršice, Moravia. Feri told media that the attackers shouted at him "niggers do not belong in politics", however this allegation was not repeated during formal police investigation. Criminal proceedings against the perpetrators, who paid Feri CZK 1.000 (~ USD 40) in damages for a torn shirt, were conditionally suspended, i.e. concluded without conviction.

Rape case

Newspaper allegations

This story was published in the two online newspapers after a discussion was started by an anonymous Twitter account, where many participants wrote about Feri being aggressive to women, in many cases demanding sexual intercourse. As was stated in Czech media, these alleged assaults and sexual offense cases took place between 2015 and 2020. A number of unnamed sources cited in the articles noted that Feri's behavior has been known in his social circles for an extended period of time. Feri announced his resignation and withdrawal from the 2021 Czech legislative election. Feri also left TOP09, his political party. 

More women came forward after the initial articles were published. This led to further allegations of Feri's sexual misconduct being published in early June 2021 by the two sites. Names of the accusers were again withheld. While the accusers in the previous article described use of force, one of the new accusers alleged use of a date rape drug by Feri on her. The testimonies portrayed a pattern of behavior whereby Feri, who had over 1.1 million online followers, would contact young women, some of them underage, often living far away from Prague, through social media for a friendly meeting or a party. The girls, dazzled by his VIP persona, would voluntarily accept the invitation, sometimes after weeks-long persuasion. Initially friendly meetings with Feri, who was well known for his support for Me Too movement, with talks focused on politics or societal issues, would allegedly later turn towards sexual violence, ending either in alleged sexual assault, rape or successful escape.

Charges and indictment
Following the newspaper articles, Police of the Czech Republic opened investigation into the case. In March 2022, Feri was charged with multiple counts of rape and attempted rape. As one of the alleged rape victims was only seventeen years old, Feri was charged also with rape of a child (age of consent in the Czech Republic is 15). If convicted, Feri may be sentenced to up to 10 years imprisonment. The charges concerned rapes committed on three different victims. Investigation regarding rape and sexual assault allegations brought by five other accusers concluded in September 2022 with no charges.

Feri was indicted on 13 December 2022. District State Attorney Office for Prague 3 stated that the indictment is for two counts of committed rapes and one count of attempted rape, without specifying which of the three counts concerns the child. Feri commented: "I welcome the fact that after a nearly two-year wait, I will be able to present evidence to the court proving my innocence. Until now, I have not been able to comment publicly on the ongoing proceedings in any substantive way, which has resulted in the media being reduced to one-sided statements. However, this is about to finally change."

Trial

Day 1 of the trial
Dominik Feri's rape trial commenced on 14 February 2023. Before entering the courtroom, Feri spoke to journalists in the courthouse hallway. While proclaiming his innocence, Feri highlighted that those alleged rapes which received the widest media attention were dismissed after police investigation. Feri singled out one journalist working for MF Dnes, who anonymously alleged having been raped by Feri in a shower: "Yet these stories live on in the media and it's such a big deal that it's a sure thing, the shower. It really isn't. The shower is something that therefore strikes me as deeply unfair when, even though it's been legally dismissed, the lady is still, as a journalist, simply lying to the media." Feri named the accuser, for which he was condemned by journalists and politicians alike.

In order to protect the privacy of the victims, the senate decided to exclude public during their witness statements as well as during presentation of expert opinions. Rest of the trial remained open to the public.

The trial concerned the following three counts of rape and attempted rape:

Count 1 of rape of a child, which was supposed to take place in Feri's flat in Prague in March 2016.  State Attorney alleged that Feri invited an underage girl into his flat, where he sexually harrassed her, stating that she is "little and immature", and that other women would appreciate his advances. The child allegedly refused to engage in sexual activity with Feri. He then allegedly offered her Fanta, and after drinking it, she fell into semi-unconscious state, in which Feri allegedly started to rape her first with his fingers, and then he allegedly raped her orally by conducting cunnilingus on her. 
 In his opening statement, Feri refused the indictment, stating that he considers such behaviour as repulsive, and that he never abused any of the victims. Regarding the first count, Feri alleged that the situation was mutually voluntary. Feri stated, that on the day of alleged rape, the pair had a date which started in a wine bar. They then went into his flat, where they engaged in mutual kissing. However, the victim refused to go further. Feri alleges that afterwards they slept in the same bed with no further intimate activity. Feri vehemently refused putting any drugs into the victim's drink.
Count 2 of rape, which was supposed to take place in Feri's flat in Prague in November 2016.  State Attorney alleged that Feri invited a young woman along with his friends into his flat. Once inside, he started to sexually assault her, commenting her refusals with statement that "she should stop making trouble".  The woman felt paralyzed, at which point Feri supposedly brought her to a bedroom and conducted involuntary sexual intercourse on her. 
 Feri refused also the second count, claiming he and the victim were a pair in an ongoing sexual relationship. He also pointed out communication that he and the victim had after the alleged rape and claimed that they remained in contact after the date of the alleged rape.
Count 3 of attempted rape which was supposed to take place within the building of the Chamber of Deputies in February 2018.  State Attorney alleged that Feri invited a young woman for interview for an internship position and attempted to rape her.
 Feri stated that the third alleged victim contacted him regarding possible internship. He invited her into the Chamber of Deputies, where both of them drank some beers in the parliament's bar in the evening. On the way to his office, they engaged in allegedly mutual kissing in the elevator. Feri stated that he later apologized for the kissing as unprofessional. He alleged that nothing else happened, claiming it illogical that he would try to rape the woman in publicly accessible part of TOP09 party's parliamentary quarters (common kitchen area), as claimed by the victim, while his private office was right next to it.

After denying the particular rape counts, Feri stated: "I certainly didn't suffer from a lack of interest from women at the time. There was a lot of interest, sometimes unpleasant. I certainly didn't have to force anything. I'm being ascribed something that has no basis in logic as to why I should do it." 

After conclusion of Feri's testimony, the public was excluded for the testimony of the first alleged victim, which lasted for four hours.

In the afternoon, the court was again open to public for testimonies of witnesses. The first witness was a friend of the first victim. She testified that she received a phonecall from the victim the day after the alleged rape. The victim described to the witness that she voluntarily entered Feri's flat. After refusing his advances, she alleged to have drank some bevarage leading her to remember only snippets of what happened afterwards. The victim described being unable to move, and having been subject to penetration by Feri's fingers and subjected to oral sex. The witness stated that victim was very stressed and left no doubt as regards truthfulness of her statement. She further commented that they both used to admire Feri before the incident. According to witness, the victim started to suffer from panic disorder, and was also particularly angry that Feri was publicly supporting the Me Too Movement after the alleged rape.

Day 2 of the trial
The trial continued on 16 February 2023 with statements of the alleged victims No. 2 and 3, as well as presentation of expert opinions. Public was excluded from the courtroom for the day.

The trial was adjourned for 25 April 2023.

Personal life
Feri plays accordion and piano. He stated that his opinions are close to those of the Czech Pirate Party.

In May 2022, Feri was hospitalized after apparent suicide attempt, whereby he self-inflicted cut wounds to his arms and belly.

References

1996 births
Living people
People from Kadaň
Czech politicians
Czech people of Ethiopian descent
TOP 09 MPs
Members of the Chamber of Deputies of the Czech Republic (2017–2021)
Charles University alumni